The 1959 6-Hour Le Mans Production Car Race was staged on 1 June 1959 at the Caversham Race Circuit in Western Australia. The race, which was organised by the WA Sporting Car Club, was the fifth annual Six Hour Le Mans.

The race was won by Clem Dwyer and Vin Smith, driving a Triumph TR3A.

Results

Teams Award
Diesel Motors - Clem Dywer & Vin Smith (Triumph TR3A), Don Reimann & John Glasson (Standard Ten Cadet), Bob Annear & D Reiman (Standard Ten Cadet)

Lambretta Trophy
David Sadique (Simca Aronde)

Notes
 Entries: 27
 Starters: 24
 Finishers: 19
 Distance covered by winning car: 387 miles
 Average speed of winning car: 64.9 mph

References

Further reading
 Jim Shepherd, A History of Australian Motor Sport, 1980, pages 150–151

Six Hours Le Mans
Six Hour Le Mans
June 1959 sports events in Australia